Hard Works is a compilation album by Phil Beer released 20 November 2000 and again on 15 December 2008 with a different cover, the album aims at collecting all the tracks from Hard Hats and The Works.

Released on Beer's Talking Elephant label, they said of the album "This double CD release features the two albums “Hard Hats” from 1994 and “The Works” from 1989. This was during the time when Phil was touring with The Rolling Stones and near the beginnings of Show of Hands. Thus this was a great time for Phil and the music reflects this. It reflects the work of a truly talented multi-instrumentalist in depth and gravity and also highlights the more quirky, light nature of his music.". This confused many people, The Works was believed to be released in 1998, but they confused people it was released in 1989.

Track listing

Disc one: Hard Hats
Fireman's Song
Blind Fiddler
Chance
This Year
This Far
Hard Hats
Blinded By Love
She Could Laugh
More
Think It Over
Fireman's Song (Acoustic) (Bonus track)

Disc two: The Works
General Ward / Tobins / The Starling
Swannee River
Staten Island / Soldier's Joy
Haste To The Wedding / Mohawk / The Cap Sizun
Thomas Morris / Chasing The Jack
Michael Turner's Waltz
Gypsy Moth
Jig / Banish Misfortune
Lost In Space / Altan / Teetotalers
Flash Company
Jenny On The Shore / The Bull
Rocky Road To Mylor

References

2008 compilation albums
Phil Beer albums